Aesopia cornuta is a species of sole native to the Indian and western Pacific Oceans. Its common names include the unicorn sole, thickray sole, banded sole, and dark thick-rayed sole.

See also
 Pseudaesopia and Zebrias, two related genera with similar striped patterns

References

Soleidae
Taxa named by Johann Jakob Kaup
Fish described in 1858